Alberta charter schools are a special type of public schools which have a greater degree of autonomy than a normal public school, to allow them to offer programs that are significantly different from regular public schools operated by district school boards. Charter schools report directly to the province, bypassing their local district school board, may not exceed their assigned quota of students without provincial permission, and are currently limited to fifteen schools. 
Alberta charter schools are publicly funded and the school associations must be non-profit societies. The charter schools cannot have a religious affiliation, cannot charge tuition, and cannot operate on a for-profit basis. The teachers must be certified, and the curriculum must follow the approved provincial curriculum. Alberta, which passed enabling legislation in 1994, is the only province in Canada to have charter schools.

Charter schools

Current charters
There are 24 charter school campuses operated by 14 schools. The number of charter schools was limited to a maximum of 15, but the Provincial government eliminated this cap effective September 2020.

Former charters
Three charter school have closed:
The Global Learning Academy, in Calgary, was granted a charter in 1996, and with 480 students was the largest charter school in the province. However, mismanagement and financial problems resulted in the suspension of its founding principal in December 1997, the replacement of its board of directors with a trustee in January 1998, and the revocation of the school's charter before the start of the 1998–1999 school year.  
The Moberly Hall Charter School, the only charter school hosted by a Roman Catholic school board, operated in Fort McMurray from 1997 to 2007 before voluntarily closing because of declining enrollment and rising costs.
The Mundare Charter School was established in Mundare by parents in 1997 when the town's elementary/junior high school closed, but operated for only one year. It was absorbed into the local public school board as an alternative elementary school after low enrollment resulted in financial difficulty.

References

Education in Alberta